Andrés Gómez was the defending champion but he lost in the second round to Gary Muller.
Top-seeded Mats Wilander claimed the title by defeating Kent Carlsson in the final, as he had in Boston a week earlier.

Seeds
The top eight seeds received a bye into the second round. A champion seed is indicated in bold text while text in italics indicates the round in which that seed was eliminated.

  Mats Wilander (champion)
  Andrés Gómez (second round)
  Kent Carlsson (final)
  Martín Jaite (quarterfinals)
  Joakim Nyström (semifinals)
  Tarik Benhabiles (second round)
  Thierry Tulasne (second round)
  Jimmy Arias (second round)
  Jay Berger (second round)
  Guillermo Pérez Roldán (semifinals)
  Horacio de la Peña (first round)
  Guillermo Vilas (third round)
  Mel Purcell (second round)
  Andre Agassi (third round)
  Todd Witsken (second round)
  Diego Pérez (third round)

Draw

Finals

Top half

Section 1

Section 2

Bottom half

Section 3

Section 4

References

External links
 ATP Singles draw
 ITF tournament edition details

1987 Grand Prix (tennis)
Men's Singles